Lienhart is a surname. Notable people with the surname include:

Andreas Lienhart (born 1986), Austrian footballer
Georges Lienhart (1886–1952), French World War I flying ace
Johann Lienhart (born 1960), Austrian cyclist
Philipp Lienhart (born 1996), Austrian footballer

See also
Lienhard
Lienhardt
Linhart
Linhardt